Luenell Campbell (born March 12, 1959), known mononymously as Luenell, is an American comedian and actress.

Career
In the early-1990s, Luenell appeared regularly on Soul Beat TV on the Oakland, California cable station KSBT, along with prominent Bay Area African-American journalist Chauncey Bailey, an interviewer and talk show host on the program.

On June 18, 2001, Luenell married her husband, whom she refers to as Mr. Rarely. They have a daughter, Da'Nelle.

Filmography

Film

Television

References

External links

 
 

1959 births
Living people
People from Howard County, Arkansas
Actresses from Arkansas
African-American actresses
African-American female comedians
Actresses from Oakland, California
American women comedians
People from Castro Valley, California
Comedians from California
20th-century American comedians
21st-century American comedians
20th-century African-American women
20th-century African-American people
21st-century American women
21st-century African-American women
21st-century African-American people